The vinyl revival, also known as the vinyl resurgence, is the renewed interest and increased sales of vinyl records, or gramophone records, that has been taking place in the music industry. Beginning in 2007, vinyl records experienced renewed popularity in the West and in East Asia.

The analogue format made of polyvinyl chloride had been the main vehicle for the commercial distribution of pop music from the 1950s until the 1980s and 1990s when it was largely replaced by the compact disc (CD). Since the turn of the millennium, CDs have been partially replaced by digital downloads and streaming services. However, in 2007, vinyl sales made a sudden small increase, starting its comeback, and by the early 2010s, it was growing at a very quick rate. In some territories, vinyl is now more popular than it has been since the late 1980s, though vinyl records still make up only a marginal percentage (less than 6%) of overall music sales. In 2022, Taylor Swift's Midnights became the first major album release to have its vinyl sales outpace CDs since 1987, with approximately 600,000 sold in the US and 80,000 sold in the UK at the time of the record occurring. By January 2023, it had moved over a million vinyl LPs in the US – the only 21st-century album to do so.

Along with steadily increasing vinyl sales, the vinyl revival is also evident in the renewed interest in the record shop (as seen by the creation of the annual worldwide Record Store Day), the implementation of music charts dedicated solely to vinyl, and an increased output of films (largely independent) dedicated to the vinyl record and culture.

History
In June 2017, Sony Music announced that by March 2018 it would be producing vinyl records in-house for the first time since ceasing its production in 1989. The BBC reported that "Sony's move comes a few months after it equipped its Tokyo studio with a cutting lathe, used to produce the master discs needed for manufacturing vinyl records", but the company "is even struggling to find older engineers who know how to make records".

In Germany

In Germany a revival of vinyl records already took place in the 1990s in conjunction with the rise of the rave and techno scene. In the mid-1990s, the rave culture had become a mass movement in the country, with raves having tens of thousands of attendees, youth magazines featuring styling tips, and television networks launching music magazines on house and techno music. In this context Der Spiegel in 1998 describes this "renaissance" of the LP format and declares that "LPs are in again". The CD format was regarded as "uncool", while vinyl records could be beatmatched into each other more easily and had more room for album cover art. Record bags were a common fashion accessory at that time. In the early 2000s the mainstream rave movement declined, and by the end of the decade a majority of the so-called "techno record stores" and record store chains that had emerged in the 1990s had disappeared again.

Around 2007 another revival of vinyl began, this time also concerning the collection of other genres such as pop music, and increasingly promoted by the music industry.

In 2016 there were 476 record stores in Germany, and 3.1 million vinyl records were sold. In 2020, sales of vinyl LPs in Germany increased to 4.2 million units sold. Almost three quarters of the 20 most popular records of this year belong to the rock music genre.

In Japan
Sales of music CDs in Japan began in 1982. By 1986, the compact disc began replacing the gramophone record as the primary means of music distribution in Japan. As opposed to declining CD sales in Western markets, CDs remained a huge market in Japan, with sales of over 100 million each year from 1998 until 2018. Beginning in the early 2000s decade, there was growing nostalgia for vinyl records, although CD sales were still strong. Inspired by the Record Store Day event in the United States, Japanese record stores began promoting the revival of gramophone records in 2012. Concurrently, popular musicians including Sakanakushon, AKB48, Perfume, and Masaharu Fukuyama began releasing their music for vinyl distribution. In 2014, HMV Record Shop, a proponent in selling vinyl records, opened in Shibuya. Technology brands such as Sony Electronics and Panasonic released revived models of gramophone record players, starting in 2016.

From the mid-2010s decade, vinyl records have enjoyed renewed popularity, with specialized shops opening in Shibuya, Shinjuku, and Ginza. From 2010 to 2020, vinyl sales in Japan increased tenfold, from 105,000 copies to 1,219,000 copies. Although the 2020 figure did not match that of 2000 (when nearly two million vinyl records were sold), it was the best figure since 2004. Popular artists such as Perfume and Back Number have led the way for vinyl revival, and CD sales have declined by 35% from 2008 to 2018.

In the United Kingdom
Similarly in the United Kingdom, the compact disc surpassed the gramophone record in popularity in the late 1980s. This started a gradual decline in vinyl record sales throughout the 1990s. Sales of vinyl LP records in the UK increased every year between 2007 and 2014 In December 2011, BBC Radio 6 Music began an occasional Vinyl Revival series in which Peter Paphides met musicians who revealed, and played selections from, their vinyl record collections. In November 2014, it was reported that over one million vinyl records had been sold in the UK since the beginning of the year. Sales had not reached this level since 1996. The British Phonographic Industry (BPI) predicted that Christmas sales would bring the total for the year to around 1.2 million. However, vinyl sales were still a very small proportion of total music sales. Pink Floyd's The Endless River became the fastest-selling UK vinyl release of 2014 – and the fastest-selling since 1997 – despite selling only 6,000 copies. In 2016, 3.2 million vinyl records were sold in the UK, the best sale for a quarter of a century.

As of 2016 the revival continued, with UK vinyl sales exceeding streaming audio revenue for the year. In January 2017, the BPI's 'Official UK recorded music market report for 2016', using Official Charts Company data, noted that "Though still niche in terms of its size within the overall recorded music market, vinyl enjoyed another stellar year, with over 3.2 million LPs sold – a 53 per cent rise on last year". The BPI also reported that "The biggest-selling vinyl artist was David Bowie, with 5 albums posthumously featuring in the top-30 best-sellers, including his Mercury Prize shortlisted Blackstar, which was 2016's most popular vinyl recording ahead of Amy Winehouse's Back To Black, selling more than double the number of copies of 2015's best seller on vinyl – Adele's 25".

BBC Radio 4's Front Row discussed the increase in coloured vinyl releases in October 2017 in the wake of recent albums in the format by Beck, Liam Gallagher, and St. Vincent.

In December 2021, The Guardian reported: According to the British Phonographic Industry (BPI), more than 5m vinyl albums have been bought in the UK over the past 12 months, up 8% on sales in 2020 and the 14th consecutive year of growth since 2007.
By the end of the year, vinyl will have accounted for almost one in four album purchases – the highest proportion since 1990 – according to BPI estimates.

In the United States
In 1988, the compact disc surpassed the gramophone record in popularity. Vinyl records experienced a sudden decline in popularity between 1988 and 1991, when the major label distributors restricted their return policies, which retailers had been relying on to maintain and swap out stocks of relatively unpopular titles.

First, the distributors began charging retailers more for new product if they returned unsold vinyl, and then they stopped providing any credit at all for returns. Retailers, fearing they would be stuck with anything they ordered, only ordered proven, popular titles that they knew would sell, and devoted more shelf space to CDs and cassettes. Record companies also deleted many vinyl titles from production and distribution, further undermining the availability of the format and leading to the closure of pressing plants. This rapid decline in the availability of records accelerated the format's decline in popularity, and is seen by some as a deliberate ploy to make consumers switch to CDs, which were more profitable for the record companies.
But ever since 2007, the popularity of vinyl records has risen again. The largest online retailer of vinyl records in 2014 was Amazon with a 12.3% market share, while the largest physical retailer of vinyl records was Urban Outfitters with an 8.1% market share.

In its 'Shipment and Revenue Statistics' report for 2016, the Recording Industry Association of America noted that "Shipments of vinyl albums were up 4% to $430 million, and comprised 26% of total physical shipments at retail value – their highest share since 1985". In 2019, Rolling Stone said that "Vinyl records earned $224.1 million (on 8.6 million units) in the first half of 2019, closing in on the $247.9 million (on 18.6 million units) generated by CD sales. Vinyl revenue grew by 12.8% in the second half of 2018 and 12.9% in the first six months of 2019, while the revenue from CDs barely budged. If these trends hold, records will soon be generating more money than compact discs". Best Buy discontinued CDs in 2019, but  still sells vinyl. Target Corporation and Walmart still sell CDs, but use less shelf space for them and use more space for vinyl records, players, and accessories.

By 2019, vinyl sales continued healthy growth at the expense of other physical media and despite the growing prominence of streaming, presently the cheapest (legal) way to listen to music. In the first half of 2020, vinyl recordings outsold CDs (in terms of revenue) in the US for the first time since the 1980s. In 2020 vinyl recordings accounted only for 5.1% ($619.6m) of total US music revenues and CDs accounted for 4% ($483.3m) of revenues.  Digital and streaming formats accounted for the remainder of the $12.2 billion in US music revenues, with paid subscriptions accounting for 57.7% of total revenue at $7.0 Billion. Americans across age groups have been contributing to the preservation and revival of vinyl records. According to a 2019 YouGov poll, 31% of the U.S. population is willing to pay for music on vinyl, including 36% of Baby boomers, 33% of Generation X, 28% of Millennials, and 26% of Generation Z.

Taylor Swift's ninth studio album, Evermore (2020), sold 102,000 vinyl LPs in a single week in June 2021, breaking the record for the biggest vinyl sales week for an album since MRC Data began tracking sales in 1991. In 2021, for the first time in the last 30 years, vinyl record sales exceeded CD sales; one of every 3 albums sold in the US was a vinyl LP. Indie retailers sold almost half of all vinyl LPs, while Taylor Swift was the format's top-selling artist, accounting for 2.6% of total sales. As per the MRC Data mid-year report for 2021, sales of vinyl records in the US surpassed that of the CDs; 19.2 million vinyl albums were sold in the first six months of 2021, outpacing the 18.9 million CDs sold. This has been attributed to a phenomenon of listeners looking for tangible ways to consume music, especially the fanbases of various musicians. In 2022, Swift's tenth studio album, Midnights, sold 945,000 vinyl LPs in the last two months of the year, garnering the largest vinyl sales year for an album in Luminate Data history. Swift sold 1.695 million vinyl LPs across her entire catalog in 2022, with one of every 25 vinyl LPs sold that year in the U.S. being a Swift album—a sum larger than the next two biggest-sellers of vinyl combined: Harry Styles with 719,000 and the Beatles with 553,000.

In March 2023, the RIAA published a revenue report for 2022, in which vinyl accounted for $1.2 billion of physical media sales out of a total of $1.7 billion. This was the first instance of vinyl sales growth outpacing CD sales growth since 1987 as CDs saw an 18% decline in sales year-on-year.

Reasons
Records are perceived as more durable, come in significantly larger packaging (allowing more detail in the album art to be visible), and may include bonus items absent from a CD copy of the same album (for example, a poster or clothing article, or exclusive liner notes). These factors can cause a CD to be seen as a poor value even if an LP is more expensive.

CDs are capable of more accurate sound reproduction and are effectively free of noise and sound artifacts, but many listeners find records' imperfections more subjectively pleasant than digital audio.

In spite of many record sales being modern artists or genres, records may be considered a part of retro style, benefiting from a general cultural interest in the technology and media of the past.

Sales
NOTE: Many citations below include CD sales, not just vinyl sales. This chart should be reviewed and revised for accuracy.

Annual best selling LPs in the US

Graphs

Vinyl in the media

Films

Television

Radio

On New Year's Day 2012, British radio station BBC Radio 6 Music, solely broadcast music on the vinyl format, with records coming from the collections of presenters and DJs.

Record Store Day

Most customers prefer to buy vinyl from small, independent record stores with a larger selection than department stores. Record Store Day is an internationally celebrated day observed the third Saturday of April each year. Its purpose, as conceived by independent record store employee Chris Brown, is to celebrate the art of music. The day brings together fans, artists, and thousands of independent record stores across the world.

Record Store Day was officially founded in 2007 and is celebrated globally with hundreds of recording and other artists participating in the day by making special appearances, performances, meet and greets with their fans, the holding of art exhibits, and the issuing of special vinyl and CD releases along with other promotional products to mark the occasion.

In 2013, for the week of Record Store Day in the United Kingdom, 68,936 records were sold (an 86.5% rise from 36,957 in 2012). This can be broken down into 1,249 7" albums, 25,100 12" albums, 27,042 7" singles and 15,545 12" singles.
From December 29, 2017 to June 28, 2018 there was a 19.2% increase in vinyl sales compared to the same period the previous year.
Vinyl sales hold over 18% of physical record sales in the United States, a 7% increase from previous years.

UK Official Record Store Chart
The Official Record Store Chart is a weekly music chart based on physical sales of albums in almost 100 independent record stores in the United Kingdom. It is compiled by the Official Charts Company (OCC), and each week's number one is first announced on Sunday evenings on the OCC's official website.

The chart's launch was first announced by the OCC on 17 April 2012 – at the time, British record stores were selling 4.5 million albums per year, and were contributing towards 95 per cent of the country's total vinyl sales.

Nomenclature debate
Arising within the renewed popularity of vinyl records, there is a small debate over the issue of how they should properly be referred to in English. While many refer to them as "records," sometimes a record is referred to as "vinyl" - an informal term derived from its material composition. The disagreement arises over how the word "vinyl" is used. Those who remember the vinyl records' original popularity in the 1980s and before, use the term "vinyl" in context such as "I have that album on vinyl", and also when using it in the plural, e.g. "I have a huge collection of vinyl". Those whose experience with records is only during the more recent revival, have developed a different way of using the word, referring to vinyl records in the plural as "vinyls", as well as using the indefinite article "a", such as saying "I need to go buy a vinyl". Arguments are made based on the rules of language, and whether "vinyls" could be a proper way of referring to records in the plural. On the "vinyls" side, a key argument is whether vinyl is a "mass noun": "These nouns — such as cheese, beer and wine — refer to stuff that comes in variable but conceptually undifferentiated quantities that are measured rather than counted."

See also

CX (noise reduction)
UC (noise reduction)
Conservation and restoration of vinyl discs
Album era

References

External links
 Al Jazeera news report on the world's oldest record shop

Music industry
Sound production technology
Turntables
Retro-style music